Bluebeard's Six Wives (Italian: Le sei mogli di Barbablù) is a 1950 Italian comedy film directed by Carlo Ludovico Bragaglia and starring Totò, Isa Barzizza and Carlo Ninchi. The film's sets were designed by the art directors Alberto Boccianti and Mario Rappini.

Plot
Toto Esposito is a young lover who tries to abduct his beloved to marry her. However, Toto is wrong, and kidnaps an ugly woman named Carmela, who loves him, and chases him when Toto escapes. In a last attempt to escape by train from Carmela, Totò meets his friend Amilcare and a beautiful American journalist named Lana Ross, which offers the two a deal. Toto and Amilcare have to pretend detectives, who are investigating the death of many girls at the hands of a serial killer nicknamed "Bluebeard". Toto has to be the main dish of deception, because he has to pretend to be the boyfriend of Lana, who in the meantime is trying to fool the murderous Bluebeard, pretending to be in love with him.

Cast
Totò as Totò Esposito
Isa Barzizza as Lana Ross
Arturo Bragaglia as Alvaro
Tino Buazzelli as Ladislau Zichetti / Barbablù
Aldo Bufi Landi as Il vero Patson
Mario Castellani as Amilcare
Carlo Ninchi as Nick Parter
Marcella Rovena as Silvana
Giorgio Costantini	 as Giorgio
Anna Di Lorenzo as Cameriera
Silvia Fazi as Domenica
Magda Forlenza as 	Maria
Enzo Garinei as Paesano
Franco Jamonte as Pecorino
Sofia Loren as Ragazza rapita
Nino Marchesini as Ispettore
Arnaldo Mochetti as Giuseppe	
Renato Navarrini as Renato	
Eduardo Passarelli as Impresario Pompe Funebri
Luigi Pavese as Lucas
Mario Pisu as Sergio
Leonardo Bragaglia	 as primo fratello di Alvaro
Leo Garavaglia as secondo fratello di Alvaro		
Giuseppe Recagno as dipendente Pompe Funebri	
Erminio Spalla as L'Autista
Laura Tiberti as Laura

References

Bibliography
 Moliterno, Gino. Historical Dictionary of Italian Cinema. Scarecrow Press, 2008.

External links 
 

1950 films
1950s Italian-language films
1950 comedy films
Films directed by Carlo Ludovico Bragaglia
Italian comedy films
Italian black-and-white films
1950s Italian films
Films based on Bluebeard